Krasnaya Zarya may refer to:
Krasnaya Zarya (rural locality), several rural localities in Russia
Krasnaya Zarya Leningrad (later Krasnaya Zarya St. Petersburg), former names of BSK Saint Petersburg, a defunct Russian bandy club
Krasnaya Zarya Leningrad, former name of FC Elektrosila Leningrad, a defunct Russian association football club

See also
Red Dawn (disambiguation), for names related to the translation of the term